West Virginia Route 41 (WV 41) is a  north–south state highway in the central part of the U.S. state of West Virginia. Its southern terminus is at WV 210 in Beckley.

South of Summersville, WV 41 follows the route of U.S. Route 19 (US 19) prior to the construction of Corridor L of the Appalachian Development Highway System.

Major intersections

See also

References

External links 

041
Transportation in Raleigh County, West Virginia
Transportation in Fayette County, West Virginia
Transportation in Nicholas County, West Virginia
Beckley, West Virginia